Rudolf Vogel (born 10 November 1900,  Planegg – died 9 August 1967, Munich) was a German film and television actor. He was the father of Peter Vogel, the father-in-law of Austrian actress Gertraud Jesserer and the grandfather of actor-journalist Nikolas Vogel.
Died from cancer.

Selected filmography

 Venus on Trial (1941) - Dr. Gerhard Hümmelmann
 The Little Residence (1942) - Mierke
 Einmal der liebe Herrgott sein (1942) - Fernandez
 Between Yesterday and Tomorrow (1947)
  (1948) - Kanzleirat
 The Lost Face (1948) - Professor Kersten
 The Original Sin (1948)
 Hans im Glück (1949)
 Zwei in einem Anzug (1950) - Gerichtsvollzieher
 The Disturbed Wedding Night (1950) - Bürovorsteher
 Czardas der Herzen (1951)
 Maya of the Seven Veils (1951)
 Decision Before Dawn (1951) - Volkssturmmann (uncredited)
 Der blaue Stern des Südens (1951)
 Monks, Girls and Hungarian Soldiers (1952) - Stops, Hofnarr
 Father Needs a Wife (1952) - Kellner (uncredited)
 The Exchange (1952) - Alisi Resch
 A Heart Plays False (1953) - Charles
 Music by Night (1953) - Joseph, Oberkellner
 As Long as You're Near Me (1953) - Hotelier
 The Monastery's Hunter (1953) - Bader
 Arlette Conquers Paris (1953) - Kunsthändler Jean Maurot
 Fanfare of Marriage (1953) - Wurm
 Must We Get Divorced? (1953) - Herr Huber
 Elephant Fury (1953)
 Stars Over Colombo (1953) - Yogi
 Jonny Saves Nebrador (1953) - Major Souza
 Ehestreik (1953)
 The Prisoner of the Maharaja (1954) - Yogi
 Sauerbruch – Das war mein Leben (1954) - Kellner im Bristol
 The First Kiss (1954) - Mons. Oberbitzler
 The Flying Classroom (1954) - Friseur Krüger
 Ein Haus voll Liebe (1954)
 Fireworks (1954) - Onkel Gustav
 Victoria in Dover (1954) - George - ein Lakai
 Secrets of the City (1955) - Barkeeper
 Hello, My Name is Cox (1955) - Nachtwächter Oskar Ojevaar
 Reaching for the Stars (1955)
 As Long as There Are Pretty Girls (1955) - Herr Lerch
 A Heart Full of Music (1955) - Geschäftsführer Léaux
 Royal Hunt in Ischl (1955) - Diener Charles
 The Three from the Filling Station (1955)
 I Often Think of Piroschka (1955) - Sandor
 Furlough on Word of Honor (1955) - Rudi Pichler
 Sonnenschein und Wolkenbruch (1955)
 The Beggar Student (1956) - Enterich
 Bonjour Kathrin (1956) - Fogar
 The Road to Paradise (1956)
 The Golden Bridge (1956) - Hoppe
 Hilfe - sie liebt mich (1956) - Jonny, Barkeeper im "Elysée"
 Opera Ball (1956) - Eduard von Lamberg
 Through the Forests and Through the Trees (1956) - Valerian
 Uns gefällt die Welt (1956) - Knipperdolling
 Imperial and Royal Field Marshal (1956) - Hauptmann a.D. Ferdinand Kraus
 The Girl and the Legend (1957) - Mr. Herodes Pum
 Die verpfuschte Hochzeitsnacht (1957) - Albert Berthold
 Casino de Paris (1957) - Catherine's father
 Schön ist die Welt (1957) - Fritz Müllrath, Haldens Manager
 Der Kaiser und das Wäschermädel (1957) - Ludwig Söpringbrunn, Konfektionär
 A Piece of Heaven (1957) - Herr Müller
 The Spessart Inn (1958) - Buffon Parucchio
 A Woman Who Knows What She Wants (1958) - Herzmansky, Sekretär
 The Elephant in a China Shop (1958) - Diener
 Embezzled Heaven (1958) - Kompert
 Vento di primavera (1958)
 Die Landärztin vom Tegernsee (1958) - Zipfhauser
 Wenn die Conny mit dem Peter (1958) - Generaldirector Dr. Werneck
 Die Seeteufel von Angostura (1958)
 Hula-Hopp, Conny (1959) - John Newman
 The Man Who Walked Through the Wall (1959) - Fuchs - der Kriecher
 Du bist wunderbar (1959) - Xaver Lehmann
 Marili (1959) - Berthold Glubb
 Old Heidelberg (1959) - Kammerdiener Lutz
 Mrs. Warren's Profession (1960) - Reverend Samuel Gardner
 Pension Schöller (1960) - Gutsbesitzer Philipp Klapproth
 Oh! This Bavaria! (1960)
 Crime Tango (1960) - Lorenz
 Ingeborg (1960) - Herr Konjunktiv
  (1960) - Anton Braumberger
 Ach Egon! (1961) - Theodor Nathusius
 Heute gehn wir bummeln (1961) - Tibor Teleki
 Im sechsten Stock (1961) - Hocheöpot, Buchhalter
 Eheinstitut Aurora (1962) - Graf Hohenperg
 The Bird Seller (1962) - Graf Weps
 The Forester's Daughter (1962) - Oberhofmeister
 Charley's Aunt (1963) - Niels Bergström
 Help, My Bride Steals (1964) - Psychotherapeut
 In Bed by Eight (1965) - Hofrat Andersen
 Heidi (1965) - Sebastian

References

External links

1900 births
1967 deaths
German male film actors
German male television actors
Male actors from Munich
20th-century German male actors